Kushk-e Hezar Rural District is a rural district (dehestan) in Beyza County, Fars Province, Iran. At the 2006 census, its population was 9,622, in 2,301 families.  The rural district has 15 villages.

References 

Rural Districts of Fars Province
Sepidan County